Bluff Heights is a neighborhood and historic district in Long Beach, California, composed mainly of Craftsman bungalows constructed from approximately 1910 to 1923.

Location
Bluff Heights is bordered by Broadway on the south, 4th Street on the north, Junipero Avenue and Wisconsin Avenue on the west, and Redondo Avenue on the east.

Bluff Heights is directly north of Bluff Park and south of Rose Park South.  West of Bluff Heights is Alamitos Beach and Carroll Park, to the east is Belmont Heights.

Architecture

See also
Neighborhoods of Long Beach, California

References

External links
Bluff Heights Historic District
Bluff Heights Neighborhood Association

Neighborhoods in Long Beach, California